The 2007 Citizens Bank 400 was the 15th race of the 2007 NASCAR Nextel Cup Series season.  It was held on June 17, 2007, at Michigan International Speedway, located in the town of Brooklyn, Michigan .

After this race, 11 races remained to set the field for the Chase for the Nextel Cup.

Qualifying
J. J. Yeley won his first career pole with a fast lap of 187.505 miles per hour, or 38.399 seconds.  Jimmie Johnson fell short of Yeley's lap by .001 second.  Ryan Newman, who had won the three previous poles, qualified fourth.

Michael Waltrip made only his third race in 15 tries. He had announced earlier that week that he was stepping aside for the following week's race, the Toyota/Save Mart 350, in favor of two-time series champion Terry Labonte.

Race
Carl Edwards won the Citizens Bank 400 for his first win in the Nextel Cup Series since November 4, 2005 at Texas Motor Speedway, a span of 52 races.  Edwards took the lead from Johnson on lap 166 (out of 200) and never lost it.

Martin Truex Jr. finished second; he now had a three-race span in which he finished first, third, and second.  Tony Stewart rallied from the 41st starting position to place third.  The remaining Top 5 drivers were Casey Mears and Dale Earnhardt Jr., who will be teammates at Hendrick Motorsports in 2008.

There were 22 lead changes among 11 drivers.  The race also had four caution periods; one of them was for an accident involving seven cars, including Matt Kenseth, Brian Vickers, and Jeff Green. Michigan International Speedway has been a Ford dominated track starting in 1984, and a Mercury track before that from 1969 to 1978. It was also a track that suited a smooth driver or a driver that could change his driving tactics for Michigan International Speedway.

Results

Points
Jeff Gordon (9th place) retained his points lead, by 247 over second place Denny Hamlin (14th).  They were followed by Kenseth (42nd), Johnson (19th due to a fuel-mileage problem), and Jeff Burton (24th) in that order.  Earnhardt Jr. entered the top 12 in points, the last qualifying spot for the Chase, while Mark Martin dropped out.

Race notes
Edwards, driving a Ford Fusion for Roush Fenway Racing, was only the second non-Chevrolet driver to win a race.  The other was Kenseth (Auto Club 500 at California Speedway).

References

External links
Complete race results
Points standings
Complete weather information

Citizens Bank 400
Citizens Bank 400
NASCAR races at Michigan International Speedway
Citizens Bank 400